American football was featured in the Summer Olympic Games demonstration programme in 1904 and 1932. College football was played at the 1904 Olympics, which was played at Francis Field, but was, in reality, college teams playing each other as part of their regular seasons. The sport was eventually played officially as a demonstration sport only once, in 1932. Though American football has not been played in the Olympics since then, various American football players have participated in the Olympics. The International Federation of American Football (IFAF) oversees the IFAF World Championship, which is an international tournament, which itself is held every four years.

In 2013, the International Olympic Committee gave provisional recognition to The International Federation of American Football, setting up a possible vote on its future participation in the Olympics. In 2015, American Football was not included in the 2020 additions.

1904 Summer Games

Saint Louis University and Washington University in St. Louis initially sought to contest an Olympic football championship, but were unable to host it officially. Both teams ended up simply playing their regular seasons from teams around the country, making their status as an official demonstration sport dubious. St. Louis was declared the champion "by default." As Francis Field was the main stadium for the 1904 Summer Olympics, only those games would have been considered a demonstration for Olympic crowds. Only two games at Francis Field were played that did not involve Washington University: a match between Purdue and Missouri, and the first match between two Indian school teams (Haskell and Carlisle) who were considered powerhouses in college football at the time.

Note: All games below were played at Francis Field

1932 Summer Games

IOC rejection and the future
Though American football has not been played in the Olympics since then, various American football players have participated in the Olympics. In 2013, the International Olympic Committee gave provisional recognition to the International Federation of American Football (IFAF), setting up a possible vote on its future participation in the Olympics. In 2015, American Football wasn't included in the 2020 additions with critics voicing the IFAF's lack of effort and surrounding drama around the 2015 IFAF World Championship.

Following the IOC's decline of the IFAF's application, the IFAF resubmitted its application, re-earning the provisional recognition for a possible addition in the 2024 Summer Olympics, with the earliest vote being as possible as 2017. It has also been argued that due to roster restrictions, seven-on-seven is the most likely style of play to make it as a medal event in the same vein as rugby sevens, which debuted at the 2016 Summer Olympics.

The NFL and IFAF are planning to back a proposal to include flag football, a non-contact variation of the game, as an event in the 2028 Summer Olympics in Los Angeles.

See also
 American football at the World Games
 American football at the 2005 World Games
 IFAF World Championship
 IFAF Women's World Championship

References

Olympics
1904 introductions
Discontinued sports at the Summer Olympics
Olympic demonstration sports